Karangi is a town located 10 minutes west of Coffs Harbour in New South Wales, Australia. At the 2006 census, Karangi had a population of 850 people. The town's name is derived from a local Gumbaynggirr word Garraanggi meaning mad or insane.

In the early 20th-Century gold was mined in the area, especially at Mt Brown.

Schools
 Karangi Public School

See also
Convincing ground

References

 

Towns in New South Wales
Mid North Coast
North Coast railway line, New South Wales
Mining towns in New South Wales